The 2022–23 Cypriot First Division is the 84th season of the Cypriot top-level football league.

Competition system 
14 teams will participate in the 2022–23 First Division.

It will be conducted in two phases. In the first phase, all teams will play each other twice, one at home and one away. After the completion of the 26 matches (A phase) the teams will participate in 2 groups (depending on their position) and will play ranking matches (B phase). The results, points and goals of the A' phase will be transferred to the matches. The teams in places 1–6 will compete for the championship and places leading to the European championships. The teams will face each other twice, one at home and one away. The team with the most points will be declared the champion. The champion team secures their place in the 2023–24 UEFA Champions League. In addition, the teams finishing in second and third place secure their participation in the 2023–24 UEFA Europa Conference League.

The teams in positions 7–14 will face each other twice, one at home and one away. The bottom three teams will be relegated to the Second Division.

Changes compared to the previous season 
In relation to the 2021–22 season, the teams promoted from the Second Division will participate in the 2022–23 First Division are Karmiotissa, New Salamina, Akritas Chlorakas and Enosis Neon Paralimni. The teams that will not take a part in the season are PAEEK and Ethnikos Achna who had been relegated to the Second Division.

Stadiums and locations 

Note: Table lists clubs in alphabetical order.

Regular season

League table

Results

Championship round

Championship round table

Relegation round

Relegation round table

Season statistics

Top scorers

References

External links

Cypriot First Division on soccerway

Cypriot First Division seasons
Cyprus
2022–23 in Cypriot football
Cyprus